Roberto Terán Tafur (born 28 January 1977) is a Colombian equestrian. He competed in the individual jumping event at the 2020 Summer Olympics.

References

External links
 

1977 births
Living people
Colombian male equestrians
Olympic equestrians of Colombia
Equestrians at the 2020 Summer Olympics
Sportspeople from Bogotá
Show jumping riders
21st-century Colombian people